Igor Antón Hernández (born 2 March 1983) is a Spanish former professional road bicycle racer, who rode professionally between 2005 and 2018 for the ,  and  squads.

Career 
Born in Galdakao, Basque Country, Antón's first major achievement after turning professional in 2005, was winning the sixteenth stage of the 2006 Vuelta a España, between Almería and the Calar Alto Observatory.

After impressing his team directors in 2007, where he won a stage at the Tour de Romandie, Antón was soon picked out to be the team leader for the general classification (GC) in the 2007 Vuelta a España where he ended up finishing 8th overall. The year started well, and in June he came second in the Euskal Bizikleta. Later in the same month, Antõn won the second stage in the UCI ProTour race Tour de Suisse. In the GC he came home third. In September at the Vuelta a España, Antón was in the best form of his career and held the pace of the likes of Alberto Contador and Alejandro Valverde up the mountains. A fall on the stage to Alto de L'Angliru ended his ambitions in the Vuelta. The fall caused a fractured collarbone, and Antón's season came to an early end.

The 2009 season started slowly for Antón. He started the Tour de France in July, but failed to make a great impression. The Tour was filled with bad luck for Antón as he had at least three falls during the start of the three-week race. However, Antón came out of the Tour in great form and took the season's only victory on 2 August, when he won the Subida a Urkiola.

In 2010, Anton proved to be a formidable rider in the Classics, taking 4th at La Flèche Wallonne and 6th at Liège–Bastogne–Liège. In the Vuelta a España, Anton won Stage 4 and Stage 11 giving him the leader's jersey. However, on Stage 14 whilst wearing the leader's jersey, Anton crashed heavily on a descent and was forced to retire.

In 2011, Anton won two grand tour stages. He won Stage 14 in the Giro d'Italia and Stage 19 in the Vuelta a España which were both summit finishes, the latter almost a 'home' stage with familiar climbs in Biscay and concluding in Bilbao.

In 2012, Anton built his whole season on the 2012 Vuelta a España. He ended up finishing 9th overall after an impressive race in the mountains.

In May 2015, Antón renewed with victory after a four-year drought. He would not let go of the lead on stage two, which was the last stage of the race. He finished with the lead group of five riders.

Anton retired from racing after the last stage of the 2018 Vuelta a España. He was celebrated by the public on the streets of Madrid, when riding in front of the peloton for a while. A few months later, his career was honoured by local football club Athletic Bilbao at their stadium prior to a derby match against Eibar.

Major results 

2004
 3rd Road race, National Under-23 Road Championships
 5th Overall Ronde de l'Isard
 5th Overall Volta a Lleida
1st Stage 5a
2006
 1st Overall Escalada a Montjuïc
1st Stage 1b (ITT)
 1st Stage 16 Vuelta a España
 3rd Subida a Urkiola
 5th Overall Clásica Internacional de Alcobendas
2007
 2nd Overall GP Internacional Paredes Rota dos Móveis
 4th Overall Vuelta a Castilla y León
 4th Overall Escalada a Montjuïc
 7th Overall Tour de Romandie
1st Stage 4
 8th Overall Vuelta a España
 8th Klasika Primavera
 9th GP Miguel Induráin
2008
 2nd Overall Euskal Bizikleta
 3rd Overall Tour de Suisse
1st Stage 2
 9th Clásica a los Puertos de Guadarrama
2009
 1st Subida a Urkiola
2010
 Vuelta a España
1st Stages 4 & 11
 2nd Overall Vuelta a Castilla y León
1st Stage 3
 2nd Klasika Primavera
 4th La Flèche Wallonne
 6th Overall Vuelta a la Comunidad de Madrid
 6th Liège–Bastogne–Liège
 9th Overall Tour de Romandie
1st Stage 5
 9th Overall Bayern–Rundfahrt
 9th Overall Vuelta a Burgos
2011
 1st Stage 14 Giro d'Italia
 1st Stage 19 Vuelta a España
 1st  Mountains classification Tour of Beijing
 3rd Overall Vuelta a Castilla y León
 5th La Flèche Wallonne
 8th Overall Vuelta a Burgos
2012
 3rd Klasika Primavera
 7th Overall Critérium International
 9th Overall Vuelta a España
 9th Overall Vuelta a Burgos
2013
 2nd GP Miguel Induráin
 6th Vuelta a Murcia
 8th La Flèche Wallonne
2014
 4th Prueba Villafranca de Ordizia
2015
 1st  Overall Vuelta a Asturias
1st Stage 1
 3rd Overall Vuelta a Castilla y León
2016
 9th Overall Vuelta a Burgos
 9th Gran Premio di Lugano
 10th Giro dell'Emilia
2017
 6th Overall Vuelta a Burgos
2018
 4th Overall Vuelta a Burgos

Grand Tour general classification results timeline

References

External links 

Team Profile (in Spanish)
Palmares on CyclingBase.com (French)  

1983 births
Living people
People from Galdakao
Cyclists from the Basque Country (autonomous community)
Spanish male cyclists
Tour de Suisse stage winners
Spanish Vuelta a España stage winners
Spanish Giro d'Italia stage winners
Sportspeople from Biscay